Pansy is an unincorporated community in Manitoba, Canada, within the Rural Municipality of Hanover.

A post office was opened in 1928 and a Ukrainian Catholic church and cemetery were established in 1952.

Pansy is known for its Fall Supper on the second Sunday of September. In 2016, 1,600 people were served, coming from across Manitoba and beyond.

References 

Unincorporated communities in Eastman Region, Manitoba